Anopino is a rural locality (a village) in Yurovskoye Rural Settlement, Gryazovetsky District, Vologda Oblast, Russia. The population was 14 as of 2002.

Geography 
Anopino is located 14 km northwest of Gryazovets (the district's administrative centre) by road. Gribovo is the nearest rural locality.

References 

Rural localities in Gryazovetsky District